The Canadian Journal of Program Evaluation (CJPE; ; RCEP) is an English and French -language triannual peer-reviewed academic journal focusing on the theory and practice of program evaluation. It is published by the University of Toronto Press on behalf of the Canadian Evaluation Society.

Abstracting and indexing
The journal is abstracted and indexed in:
 Allen Press Cooperative Subscription Catalogue
 AAUP Journal Subscription Catalogue
 Canadian Media List
 Corpus Almanac and Canadian Sourcebook (Print)
 Dustbooks
 Education Research Complete
 Education Source
 Emerging Sources Citation Index (ESCI)
 Oxbridge Communications Media
 Public Administration Abstracts
 Social Works Abstracts Plus
 Sociological Abstracts
 Ulrich's International Periodicals Directory

References

External links

University of Toronto Press academic journals
Triannual journals
Publications established in 1985
Multilingual journals
1985 establishments in Canada
Academic journals associated with learned and professional societies of Canada